Michael Moore Live, a 1999 television show featuring political advocate Michael Moore, ran for one six-part series. It was shown on Channel 4 and aired in the United Kingdom only, though it was broadcast from New York.

The show had a similar format to The Awful Truth but also incorporated phone-ins and a live stunt each week. It was filmed around 7pm local time, which due to the time difference made it a late-night show in the UK.  (EST is -5hrs from BST)

The live phone-ins all featured UK viewers, and questions were mainly about American policy at the time, e.g. gun control and the war in Kosovo. Each week, Moore was joined by guests, and one of the regulars was an illegal UK alien in the USA named Nigel (although his real name was James Horne). Throughout the show, he had to wear a rubber Queen Elizabeth II mask to hide his true identity.

External links
"All talked out" - review in The Guardian

British non-fiction television series
1999 British television series debuts
1999 British television series endings
1990s British satirical television series
Channel 4 original programming
English-language television shows
Works by Michael Moore